Nick Berkeley is an English photographer, film maker and writer. He was born in London in 1956, the youngest son of the composer Sir Lennox Berkeley and brother of Michael Berkeley, the composer and broadcaster.

Life and work 

As a young man Berkeley played in a band with Raymond Watts (c.1977) before signing with Island as a songwriter. He later studied photography at The Arts Institute at Bournemouth, subsequently lecturing there.

Time After Time (1997), a series of prints created by Berkeley from slit scan race finish camera footage, depicted time elapsed represented spatially. It utilised archive material of race finishes and was widely exhibited. The photographer Rankin and the cinematographer John Mathieson went on to work with Berkeley, the former curating Time After Time  and Berkeley's series The Women (1999) at the Dazed Gallery, London.

Berkeley later made two short films, one of which - WARMOVIE - utilised archive footage, much of it shot during the course of a Lancaster bomber raid over Germany. It was first shown at the Imperial War Museum in London.  WARMOVIE and SPINNING WORLD were shown at festivals throughout Europe and the UK.

In December 2014 Proud Galleries exhibited a new body of work by Berkeley entitled The Wild Ones, based on treated footage from Love and Poison, featuring the band Suede in concert in 1993. The Wild Ones consisted of a limited edition of C type prints signed by Berkeley and Brett Anderson. In 2015 Berkeley was commissioned by the BBC to write and present a series on lyrics in popular music. The first episode of The Escaped Lyric was broadcast on 31 October 2016 on BBC R4. The five part series was repeated in October 2020 and is available on BBC Sounds. In 2021 Berkeley started an ongoing collaboration with his partner, the artist Anna Best. In October 2022 Time After Time and The Wild Ones were exhibited at the Allsop Gallery in Berkeley's home town, Bridport in Dorset. 

A motorcyclist, Berkeley regularly contributes to BIKE magazine and edits the online motorcycle culture magazine BIKERGLORY.

References

External links
Portobello Film Festival

Photographers from London
Living people
Alumni of Arts University Bournemouth
Year of birth missing (living people)